Open space may refer to:

In architecture, urban planning and conservation ethics:
 Open plan, a generic term used in interior design for any floor plan, especially in workspaces, which makes use of large, open spaces and minimizes the use of small, enclosed rooms
 Landscape, areas of land without human-built structures
Open space reserve, areas of protected or conserved land on which development is indefinitely set aside
Urban open space, urban areas of protected or conserved land on which development is indefinitely set aside
Greenway (landscape), a linear chain of open space reserves or a recreational corridor through the same
 Public space, areas left open for the use of the public, such as a piazza, plaza, park, and courtyard

In business:
Open Space Technology, a procedure for conducting a business conference

In other uses:
 Open Space (band), an indie rock band from Minsk, Belarus
 Open Space (Italy), a faction within the Italian political party The People of Freedom
Open Space (magazine), magazine of the Open Spaces Society in the UK
 Open Space (TV programme), a BBC TV programme produced by their Community Programme Unit
 Open Space (publications), a music publishing collective
 Open Space Theatre, a defunct London theatre run by Charles Marowitz
 Open Space Technology, a method for organizing a participant-driven conference

See also
Outer space
Floor area ratio